Proshermacha is a genus of mygalomorph spiders in the family Anamidae, first described by Eugène Simon in 1908.

Species
 it contains 9 species:
Proshermacha armigera (Rainbow & Pulleine, 1918) — Australia (Western Australia)
Proshermacha auropilosa (Rainbow & Pulleine, 1918) — Australia
Proshermacha cuspidata (Main, 1954) — Australia (Western Australia)
Proshermacha intricata (Rainbow & Pulleine, 1918) — Australia
Proshermacha maculata (Rainbow & Pulleine, 1918) — Australia
Proshermacha subarmata Simon, 1908 — Australia
Proshermacha tepperi (Hogg, 1902) — Southern Australia
Proshermacha tigrina Simon, 1908 — Australia
Proshermacha villosa (Rainbow & Pulleine, 1918) — Australia

References

External links

Mygalomorphae genera
Anamidae